Culottes are an item of clothing worn on the lower half of the body. The term can refer to either split skirts, historical men's breeches, or women's under-pants; this is an example of fashion-industry words taken from designs across history, languages and cultures, then being used to describe different garments, often creating confusion among historians and readers. The French word culotte is (a pair of) panties, pants, knickers, trousers, shorts, or (historically) breeches; derived from the French word culot, meaning the lower half of a thing, the lower garment in this case.

In English-speaking history culottes were originally the knee-breeches commonly worn by gentlemen of the European upper-classes from the late Middle Ages or Renaissance through the early 19th century. The style of tight trousers ending just below the knee was popularized in France during the reign of Henry III (1574–1589). Culottes were normally closed and fastened about the leg, to the knee, by buttons, a strap and buckle, or a draw-string. During the French Revolution of 1789–1799, working-class revolutionaries were known as the "sans-culottes" – literally, "without culottes" – a name derived from their rejection of aristocratic apparel. In the United States, the first five presidents, from George Washington through James Monroe, wore culottes according to the style of the late 18th century.

In military uniforms

European military uniforms incorporated culottes as a standard uniform article, the lower leg being covered by either stockings, leggings, or knee-high boots. Culottes were a common part of military uniforms during the European wars of the eighteenth-century (the Great Northern War, the War of the Spanish Succession, the War of the Austrian Succession, the Seven Years' War, the French and Indian War, and the Revolutionary War).

Historical Japanese field workers and military samurai wore hakama that were sometimes tight at the bottom as French military culottes. Wider bifurcated wrap-skirt hakama were for horse-back riding. Eighteenth and nineteenth-century European women introduced culottes cut with a pattern looking like long hakama, hiding their legs while riding horses. Today Aikido and Kendo masters wear long hakama, to hide their feet from opponents.

Culottes for women
In modern English, the use of the word culottes can mean a close fitting pair of pants ending at the knees, such as Lady Diana Spencer popularised during the early 1980s. The term is used as such in the United Kingdom and Canada. In this sense, culottes are similar to the American knickerbockers (knickers), except whereas the latter are loose in fit. Culottes can also, in some cases, describe a split or bifurcated skirt or any garment which "hangs like a skirt, but is actually pants." During the Victorian Era (mid- to late-nineteenth century European culture) long split skirts were developed for horseback riding so that women could sit astride a horse with a man's saddle rather than riding side-saddle. Horse-riding culottes for women were controversial because they were used to break a sexual taboo against women riding horses when they were expected to hide their lower limbs at all times. Later, split skirts were developed to provide women more freedom to do other activities as well, such as gardening, cleaning, bike riding, etc. and still look like one is wearing a skirt.

School uniforms
Culottes are used in school uniforms for girls. They can be used along with skirts, or they may be used as a replacement for skirts. Culottes are worn as part of a uniform mainly to primary and middle schools. Culottes were also part of the uniform of UK Brownie Guides up until recently, when the uniform was modernized and the traditional brown culottes (and the navy blue culottes worn by the Girl Guides) were replaced.

Demi-denims 

A cut which emerged in the 21st century – a combined silhouette of pants which appear to be made out of two separate garments. They look like slim fit jeans from behind, like a skirt or culottes worn on top of slim fit jeans – from the front.

Contemporary French under-pants
The term "culottes" in French is now used to describe women's panties, an article of clothing that has little or no relation to the historic men's culotte breeches, except that in French, calling something "culottes" is like calling them "bottoms". The historical French term "sans-culottes" which was once the rejection of aristocrats' breeches, is now used colloquially to mean the same as an English colloquialism "going commando" or not wearing under-pants.

See also
 Skort
 Bloomers

References

1960s fashion
1990s fashion
Skirts
Trousers and shorts